Mike van Erp, better known as CyclingMikey, (born 1972/73) is a Dutch YouTuber who films drivers in London using their mobile phones, as well as committing other traffic offences, footage of which he reports to the police, and later uploads to his YouTube channel.

Video content
In November 2019, Van Erp filmed Guy Ritchie using a mobile phone while driving. Ritchie was subsequently prosecuted and banned from driving for six months. In 2021, he filmed Chris Eubank driving through a red light, an offence Eubank was subsequently prosecuted for. In April 2021, he filmed Frank Lampard using a mobile phone and holding a hot drink while driving, but the prosecution was later dropped, due to insufficient evidence, after Lampard hired lawyer Nick Freeman to deal with the case.

A regular location for Van Erp's videos and reports is a T junction beside Regent's Park, which he dubbed "Gandalf Corner", where he waits and has stopped many drivers from driving on the wrong side of the road past a pedestrian crossing island to avoid queueing to turn right.{
  "type": "FeatureCollection",
  "features": [
    {
      "type": "Feature",
      "properties": {},
      "geometry": {
        "type": "Point",
        "coordinates": [
          -0.145805,
          51.525257
        ]
      }
    }
  ]
} In September 2021, while at Gandalf Corner, Van Erp ended up on the bonnet of celebrity talent agent Paul Lyon-Maris's Range Rover while trying to stop him from making an illegal right turn. Since Lyon-Maris continued to drive with Van Erp on the bonnet, he was charged with assault and dangerous driving, besides the lesser charge of contravening a keep-left sign. Lyon-Maris pleaded guilty to the lesser charge, but he pleaded not guilty to the two greater charges, alleging that Van Erp jumped onto the bonnet whilst Van Erp claimed Lyon-Maris drove into him and he fell onto the bonnet. A jury cleared Lyon-Maris of both remaining charges.

In November 2022, Van Erp appeared on the BBC television programme Panorama, in an episode titled "Road Rage: Cars v Bikes".

Personal life
Van Erp is a Dutch national but was born and grew up in Zimbabwe. When Van Erp was 19, his father, while riding a motorbike, was killed  by a drunk driver. Van Erp moved to the UK in 1998 to pursue a career in IT. He is now a professional carer. He has also worked as a roller skating instructor.

References 

Dutch YouTubers
Year of birth missing (living people)
Living people
Dutch emigrants to England